Festa Italiana may refer to:

Festa Italiana in Portland, Oregon
Festa Italiana in Seattle, Washington
Festa Italiana in Virginia Beach, Virginia
Festa Italiana in Milwaukee, Wisconsin